Herbert Ehler Thormahlen aka Lefty (July 5, 1896 – February 6, 1955) was a pitcher in Major League Baseball who played from  through  for the New York Yankees (1917–20), Boston Red Sox (1921) and Brooklyn Robins (1925). He was born in Jersey City, New Jersey.

Biography
He was born on July 5, 1896 in Jersey City, New Jersey.

Career 
Thormalen began his professional career with the class D Chambersburg Maroons and class AA Baltimore Orioles in 1916.  When he was 21 years old, he made a one-game appearance for the New York Yankees in 1917 before returning to the minor leagues in 1918. He was once again elevated to the Yankees in 1919.  In a six-season major league career, Thormahlen posted a 29–28 record with 148 strikeouts and a 3.33 ERA in 104 appearances, including 64 starts, 27 complete games, four shutouts, three saves, and 565 innings of work. His last game was on May 7, 1925.

Death 
Thormahlen died in Los Angeles at age of 58.

Transactions
Before the 1921 season Thormahlen was traded by the Yankees along with Del Pratt, Muddy Ruel and Sammy Vick to the Red Sox in exchange for Waite Hoyt, Harry Harper, Wally Schang and Mike McNally.

References

 

Boston Red Sox players
Brooklyn Robins players
New York Yankees players
Major League Baseball pitchers
Baseball players from Jersey City, New Jersey
1896 births
1955 deaths
Chambersburg Maroons players
Baltimore Orioles (IL) players
Toronto Maple Leafs (International League) players
Minneapolis Millers (baseball) players
Kansas City Blues (baseball) players
Dallas Steers players
Rochester Tribe players
Jersey City Skeeters players
Montreal Royals players